SZNZ: Autumn is the ninth EP by American rock band Weezer, and the third of four EPs in their SZNZ (pronounced "seasons") project. It was released digitally on September 22, 2022, coinciding with the September equinox. Weezer played one of the songs from the EP, "What Happens After You?", on Jimmy Kimmel Live! the day before its release.

Background 
According to Rivers Cuomo, the record’s sound would reflect 'dance-rock' artists such as Franz Ferdinand and The Strokes. He also mentioned the EP would include synths.

Cuomo described the project's overall emotion as anxiety. 

The album's thematic and aesthetic location was described as being set in "The Mount of Beatitudes", with its associated era being passion and the last supper, along with the Salem Witch Trials.

Release 
Unlike the other SZNZ releases, Autumn did not have a lead single. Weezer officially released SZNZ: Autumn on September 22, 2022, the day of the autumnal equinox.

A music video for "What Happens After You?" was released on November 29, 2022.

Critical reception

Rob Wilson at Gigwise described the album as "an invigorating, emotionally potent update to Weezer's catalogue." Alex Hudson from Exclaim! was much more critical of the album, saying "Every musical idea on Autumn is so flimsy that Weezer quickly abandon it and senselessly move onto the next part without the slightest regard for quality, tempo, aesthetic or mood," while regarding "Should She Stay or Should She Go" as the only good song from it.

Track listing

Personnel
Weezer
 Rivers Cuomo – lead vocals, guitars, backing vocals
 Brian Bell – guitars, backing vocals
 Patrick Wilson – drums
 Scott Shriner – bass, backing vocals

Additional personnel
 Robopop – production
 Suzy Shinn – additional production
 Tyler Cole - additional production

References

2022 EPs
Atlantic Records EPs
Dance-rock albums
Weezer EPs